Renato Augusto de Assis Pinto is a Brazilian footballer who currently plays as a defensive midfielder for Rio São Paulo.

Career
He debuted against Corinthians in a game valid for the Brazilian Championship on 13 October 2010. He scored your first goal in a game against Cruzeiro.

Career statistics
(Correct )

References

External links
 ogol.com.br
 Renato Augusto at ZeroZero

1990 births
Living people
Brazilian footballers
CR Vasco da Gama players
Atlético Clube Goianiense players
Ipatinga Futebol Clube players
Associação Desportiva Cabofriense players
Araguaína Futebol e Regatas players
Campeonato Brasileiro Série A players
Sportspeople from Minas Gerais
Association football midfielders